Kim Fripp (31 October 1952 – 16 February 2023) was a Canadian ski jumper who competed in the 1976 Winter Olympics.

Fripp died in Florida on 16 February 2023 at the age of 70.

References

1952 births
2023 deaths
Canadian male ski jumpers
Olympic ski jumpers of Canada
Ski jumpers at the 1976 Winter Olympics
Skiers from Ottawa